Guo Quanbo (born 31 August 1997) is a Chinese professional footballer who currently plays as a goalkeeper for Chinese Super League club Beijing Guoan.

Club career
Guo Quanbo was born in Tianmen, Hubei. He joined Chinese Super League side Beijing Guoan's youth academy at the age of 8 in 2005 when traveling to Beijing with his family. He was promoted to Beijing Sinobo Guoan's first team squad by manager José González in 2017. On 19 May 2018, he made his senior debut in a 2–0 away win over Changchun Yatai. Beijing Guoan manager Roger Schmidt named Guo as number one in the rest of the season. He played 22 matches in his debut season and won 2018 Chinese FA Cup title with Guoan. On 3 December 2018, Guo extended his contract with the club until the end of 2023.

International career
Guo received his first call up for the China national football team by manager Marcello Lippi for the training camp of 2019 AFC Asian Cup. On 27 December 2018, he was named in the final 23-man squad. However, he was replaced by Zhang Lu on 5 January 2019.

Career statistics
.

Honours

Club
Beijing Guoan
Chinese FA Cup: 2018.

References

External links
 

1997 births
Living people
Chinese footballers
Association football goalkeepers
People from Tianmen
Footballers from Hubei
Beijing Guoan F.C. players
Chinese Super League players